The U.S. state of Florida is home to over 250 breweries. The state's first brewery, Florida Brewing Company, opened in 1896. The industry was dominated by mid-sized regional breweries until the 1950s, when national macrobreweries came to the fore, and built their own facilities in the state. Since the 1980s, and especially since legal changes in 2001, Florida has become home to many brewpub restaurants and craft breweries.

Background

Laws and definitions

Florida state licensing provides for two types of breweries: brewpubs, or restaurants that produce limited quantities of beer primarily for sale on premises, and production breweries that distribute beer offsite. By state law, Florida production breweries may have on-site taprooms, and some brewpubs also distribute offsite. A three-tiered distribution system governs offsite sales: breweries must sell their beer to a distributor who then sells it to retailers.

The Brewers Association defines several categories of breweries, all of which are present in Florida. Craft breweries are independently-owned breweries producing under 6 million barrels a year using traditional processes; most of these are microbreweries producing under 15,000 barrels a year. Regional breweries produce between 15,000 and 6 million barrels a year. Macrobreweries, also called megabreweries, produce over 6 million barrels a year.

History

The earliest brewery in Florida was Tampa's Florida Brewing Company, a regional brewery founded in 1896. Another regional brewery, Jax Brewing Company, opened in 1913 in Jacksonville. Both shifted to other products during Prohibition, and recommenced brewing when it ended. Several additional regional breweries opened in Florida after Prohibition.

From the 1950s, Florida's regional breweries suffered from competition with large-scale national breweries, and all ultimately closed. National companies built their own breweries in the state: Joseph Schlitz Brewing Company built a brewery in 1958 in Tampa, now owned by D. G. Yuengling & Son, while Anheuser-Busch built breweries at Busch Gardens Tampa in 1959 (now closed) and in Jacksonville in 1969.

Brewpubs emerged in Florida during the microbrewery boom of the 1980s and '90s, but growth remained limited by state laws banning non-standard container sizes popular among craft breweries. Governor Jeb Bush signed legislation reducing these restrictions in 2001, and from about 2005 the state saw substantial growth in brewpubs and craft production breweries. According to the Brewers Association, there are 151 craft breweries in Florida , 11th most in the United States, but 43rd per capita; these breweries produce 1,207,936 barrels a year and have an annual economic impact of over $2 million.

Breweries

Closed breweries

Notes

References

 
Brewing companies
Florida
Breweries